Darbid-e Vosta (also Romanized as Dārbīd-e Vosţá) is a village in Qalayi Rural District, Firuzabad District, Selseleh County, Lorestan Province, Iran. At the 2006 census, its population was 91, in 20 families.

References 

Towns and villages in Selseleh County